Ronna Lee Beck (born November 17, 1947) is an American attorney and jurist serving as a senior associate judge on the Superior Court of the District of Columbia.

Early life and education 
Beck was born in Pittsburgh, Pennsylvania. She earned a Bachelor of Arts from University of Michigan in 1969 and a Juris Doctor from Yale Law School in 1972.

Career 
After graduating from law school, Beck served as a law clerk for judge Theodore R. Newman Jr. on the D.C. Superior Court.

D.C. Superior Court 
On January 4, 1995, President Bill Clinton nominated Beck to a fifteen-year term as an associate judge on the Superior Court of the District of Columbia to the seat vacated by Bruce D. Beaudin. On May 22, 1995, the Senate Committee on Governmental Affairs held a hearing on her nomination. On May 25, 1995, the Committee reported her nomination favorably to the senate floor. On May 25, 1995, the full Senate confirmed her nomination by voice vote.

On March 25, 2010, the Commission on Judicial Disabilities and Tenure recommended that President Barack Obama reappoint her to second fifteen-year term as a judge on the D.C. Superior Court.

She assumed senior status on January 8, 2021.

Personal life 
Beck has lived in Washington, D.C. since 1972. She is married and has three children.

References

1947 births
Living people
20th-century American judges
20th-century American women judges
21st-century American judges
21st-century American women judges
Judges of the Superior Court of the District of Columbia
University of Michigan alumni
Yale Law School alumni